The 2016 Wimbledon Championships are described below in detail, in the form of day-by-day summaries.

Day 1 (27 June)
Seeds out:
Gentlemen's Singles:  Gaël Monfils [17],  Kevin Anderson [20],  Philipp Kohlschreiber [21],  Pablo Cuevas [29]
Ladies' Singles:  Ana Ivanovic [23],  Irina-Camelia Begu [25]
Schedule of play

Day 2 (28 June)
Schedule of play

Day 3 (29 June)
Schedule of play

Day 4 (30 June)
Seeds out:
Gentlemen's Singles:  Dominic Thiem [8],  David Ferrer [13],  Gilles Simon [16],  Ivo Karlović [23],  Viktor Troicki [25],  Benoît Paire [26],  Alexandr Dolgopolov [30]
Ladies' Singles:  Garbiñe Muguruza [2],  Belinda Bencic [7],  Samantha Stosur [14],  Karolína Plíšková [15],  Johanna Konta [16],  Elina Svitolina [17],  Sara Errani [20],  Jelena Janković [22],  Caroline Garcia [30],  Kristina Mladenovic [31],  Andrea Petkovic [32]
Gentlemen's Doubles:  Jean-Julien Rojer /  Horia Tecău [4]
Ladies' Doubles: Xu Yifan /  Zheng Saisai [9],  Andreja Klepač /  Katarina Srebotnik [11],  Margarita Gasparyan /  Monica Niculescu [12]
Schedule of play

Day 5 (1 July)
Seeds out:
Gentlemen's Singles:  Stan Wawrinka [4]
Ladies' Singles:  Daria Kasatkina [29]
Schedule of play

Day 6 (2 July)
Seeds out:
Gentlemen's Singles:  Novak Djokovic [1],  Roberto Bautista Agut [14],  Jack Sock [27]
Ladies' Singles:  Petra Kvitová [10],  Kiki Bertens [26]
Gentlemen's Doubles:  Łukasz Kubot /  Alexander Peya [7],  Juan Sebastián Cabal /  Robert Farah [13]
Ladies' Doubles:  Sara Errani /  Oksana Kalashnikova [15]
Schedule of play

Middle Sunday (3 July)
For only the fourth time in Wimbledon history, play was scheduled for the middle Sunday to avoid the tournament overrunning due to rain interruptions.
Seeds out:
Gentlemen's Singles:  John Isner [18],  Feliciano López [22],  Alexander Zverev [24],  João Sousa [31]
Ladies' Singles:  Roberta Vinci [6],  Timea Bacsinszky [11],  Sloane Stephens [19],  Barbora Strýcová [24]
Ladies' Doubles:  Chan Hao-ching /  Chan Yung-jan [3],  Bethanie Mattek-Sands /  Lucie Šafářová [7],  Vania King /  Alla Kudryavtseva [13],  Kiki Bertens /  Johanna Larsson [16]
Mixed Doubles:  Horia Tecău /  Coco Vandeweghe [3],  Raven Klaasen /  Raquel Atawo [7],  Daniel Nestor /  Chuang Chia-jung [12]
Schedule of play

Day 7 (4 July)
Seeds out:
Gentlemen's Singles:  Kei Nishikori [5],  Richard Gasquet [7],  David Goffin [11],  Nick Kyrgios [15],  Bernard Tomic [19]
Ladies' Singles:  Agnieszka Radwańska [3],  Madison Keys [9],  Carla Suárez Navarro [12],  Svetlana Kuznetsova [13],  Coco Vandeweghe [27],  Lucie Šafářová [28]
Gentlemen's Doubles:  Ivan Dodig /  Marcelo Melo [5],  Rohan Bopanna /  Florin Mergea [6],  Dominic Inglot /  Daniel Nestor [9],  Pablo Cuevas /  Marcel Granollers [15]
Mixed Doubles:  Max Mirnyi /  Chan Hao-ching [4],  Jean-Julien Rojer /  Kiki Bertens [8]
Schedule of play

Day 8 (5 July)
Seeds out:
Ladies' Singles:  Simona Halep [5],  Dominika Cibulková [19],  Anastasia Pavlyuchenkova [21]
Gentlemen's Doubles:  Vasek Pospisil /  Jack Sock [8],  Radek Štěpánek /  Nenad Zimonjić [14],  Mate Pavić /  Michael Venus [16]
Ladies' Doubles:  Andrea Hlaváčková /  Lucie Hradecká [6]
Mixed Doubles:  Ivan Dodig /  Sania Mirza [1],  Rohan Bopanna /  Anastasia Rodionova [13]
Schedule of play

Day 9 (6 July)
Seeds out:
Gentlemen's Singles:  Marin Čilić [9],  Jo-Wilfried Tsonga [12],  Sam Querrey [28],  Lucas Pouille [32]
Gentlemen's Doubles:  Bob Bryan /  Mike Bryan [2],   Jamie Murray /  Bruno Soares [3],  Henri Kontinen /  John Peers [10]
Ladies' Doubles:  Anabel Medina Garrigues /  Arantxa Parra Santonja [14]
Mixed Doubles:  Bruno Soares /  Elena Vesnina [2],  Nenad Zimonjić /  Chan Yung-jan [5],  Łukasz Kubot /  Andrea Hlaváčková [6] 
Schedule of play

Day 10 (7 July)
Seeds out:
Ladies' Singles:  Venus Williams [8]
Gentlemen's Doubles:  Raven Klaasen /  Rajeev Ram [11],  Treat Huey /  Max Mirnyi [12]
Ladies' Doubles:  Martina Hingis /  Sania Mirza [1],  Caroline Garcia /  Kristina Mladenovic [2],  Ekaterina Makarova /  Elena Vesnina [4]
Mixed Doubles:  Radek Štěpánek /  Lucie Šafářová [9],  Alexander Peya /  Andreja Klepač [10],  Marcin Matkowski /  Katarina Srebotnik [11],  Leander Paes /  Martina Hingis [16]
Schedule of play

Day 11 (8 July)
Seeds out:
Gentlemen's Singles:  Roger Federer [3],  Tomáš Berdych [10]
Ladies' Doubles:  Julia Görges /  Karolína Plíšková [8],  Raquel Atawo /  Abigail Spears [10]
Mixed Doubles:  Aisam-ul-Haq Qureshi /  Yaroslava Shvedova [14]
Schedule of play

Day 12 (9 July)
Defending champion Serena Williams successfully defended her title and seventh Wimbledon crown, she is now tied with Steffi Graf 22 Women's Singles titles in the Open Era. 
Seeds out:
Ladies' Singles:  Angelique Kerber [4]
Ladies' Doubles:  Tímea Babos /  Yaroslava Shvedova [5]
Schedule of play

Day 13 (10 July)
Seeds out:
Gentlemen's Singles:  Milos Raonic [6]
Mixed Doubles:  Robert Farah /  Anna-Lena Grönefeld [15]
Schedule of play

References

Day-by-day summaries
Wimbledon Championships Day-by-day summaries
Wimbledon Championships by year – Day-by-day summaries